Ramelow is a surname. Notable people with the surname include:

Bodo Ramelow (born 1956), German politician
Carsten Ramelow (born 1974), German footballer

See also 
Cabinet Ramelow, 8th Cabinet of the German federal state of Thuringia